Steven Thomas O'Ban (born July 12, 1961) is an American politician and attorney who served as a member of the Washington State Senate, representing the 28th district from 2013 to 2021. A member of the Republican Party, he previously served as a member of the Washington House of Representatives in 2013.

Career 
A Republican, he represented the 28th Legislative District in Pierce County. He was appointed to the State Senate by the Pierce County Council on June 4, 2013, following the death of State Senator Mike Carrell. On November 3, 2020, O'Ban lost the long-held Republican seat to T'wina Nobles. Preceding his appointment, O'Ban served for less than five months as a member of the Washington State House of Representatives.

References

1961 births
Living people
Republican Party members of the Washington House of Representatives
Republican Party Washington (state) state senators
University of Washington alumni
Seattle University School of Law alumni
Politicians from Tacoma, Washington
21st-century American politicians